Qingxu County is a county of Shanxi Province, North China, it is under the administration of the prefecture-level city of Taiyuan, the capital of the province. The population was estimated to be 344,472 in 2020.

As of summer of 2019, Donghu which is one of the cities largest lakes was drained. A section of Wenyuan road which is considered a large and important road in the city was bulldozed due to water pipe repairs. 

Qingxu is called the vinegar capital of China, as well as being known for grape cultivation.

The largest Catholic community in China is in Qingxu.

Climate

References

www.xzqh.org 

County-level divisions of Shanxi